Aralykh may refer to:
 Verin Kelanlu, Armenia
 Yerazgavors, Armenia